can be broadly divided into metals, metalloids and nonmetals according to their shared physical and chemical properties. All metals have a shiny appearance (at least when freshly polished); are good conductors of heat and electricity; form alloys with other metals; and have at least one basic oxide. Metalloids are metallic-looking brittle solids that are either semiconductors or exist in semiconducting forms, and have amphoteric or weakly acidic oxides. Typical nonmetals have a dull, coloured or colourless appearance; are brittle when solid; are poor conductors of heat and electricity; and have acidic oxides. Most or some elements in each category share a range of other properties; a few elements have properties that are either anomalous given their category, or otherwise extraordinary.

Properties

Metals

Metals appear lustrous (beneath any patina); form mixtures (alloys) when combined with other metals; tend to lose or share electrons when they react with other substances; and each forms at least one predominantly basic oxide.

Most metals are silvery looking, high density, relatively soft and easily deformed solids with good electrical and thermal conductivity, closely packed structures, low ionisation energies and electronegativities, and are found naturally in combined states.

Some metals appear coloured (Cu, Cs, Au), have low densities (e.g. Be, Al) or very high melting points (e.g. W, Nb), are liquids at or near room temperature (e.g. Hg, Ga), are brittle (e.g. Os, Bi), not easily machined (e.g. Ti, Re), or are noble (hard to oxidise, e.g. Au, Pt) or have nonmetallic structures (Mn and Ga are structurally analogous to, respectively, white P and I).

Metals comprise the large majority of the elements, and can be subdivided into several different categories. From left to right in the periodic table, these categories include the highly reactive alkali metals; the less reactive alkaline earth metals, lanthanides and radioactive actinides; the archetypal transition metals, and the physically and chemically weak post-transition metals. Specialized subcategories such as the refractory metals and the noble metals also exist.

Metalloids

Metalloids are metallic looking brittle solids; tend to share electrons when they react with other substances; have weakly acidic or amphoteric oxides; and are usually found naturally in combined states.

Most are semiconductors, and moderate thermal conductors, and have structures that are more open than those of most metals.

Some metalloids (As, Sb) conduct electricity like metals.

The metalloids, as the smallest major category of elements, are not subdivided further.

Nonmetals

Nonmetals have open structures (unless solidified from gaseous or liquid forms); tend to gain or share electrons when they react with other substances; and do not form distinctly basic oxides.

Most are gases at room temperature; have relatively low densities; are poor electrical and thermal conductors; have relatively high ionisation energies and electronegativities; form acidic oxides; and are found naturally in uncombined states in large amounts.

Some nonmetals (C, black P, S and Se) are brittle solids at room temperature (although each of these also have malleable, pliable or ductile allotropes).

From left to right in the periodic table, the nonmetals can be divided into the reactive nonmetals and the noble gases. The reactive nonmetals near the metalloids show some incipient metallic character, such as the metallic appearance of graphite, black phosphorus, selenium and iodine. The noble gases are almost completely inert.

Comparison of properties

Overview

 properties of metals and nonmetals are quite distinct, as shown in the table below. Metalloids, straddling the metal-nonmetal border, are mostly distinct from either, but in a few properties resemble one or the other, as shown in the shading of the metalloid column below and summarized in the small table at the top of this section.

Authors differ in where they divide metals from nonmetals and in whether they recognize an intermediate metalloid category. Some authors count metalloids as nonmetals with weakly nonmetallic properties. Others count some of the metalloids as post-transition metals.

Details

Anomalous properties

Within each category, elements can be found with one or two properties very different from the expected norm, or that are otherwise notable.

Metals

Sodium, potassium, rubidium, caesium, barium, platinum, gold
The common notions that "alkali metal ions (group 1A) always have a +1 charge" and that "transition elements do not form anions" are textbook errors. The synthesis of a crystalline salt of the sodium anion Na− was reported in 1974. Since then further compounds ("alkalides") containing anions of all other alkali metals except Li and Fr, as well as that of Ba, have been prepared. In 1943, Sommer reported the preparation of the yellow transparent compound CsAu. This was subsequently shown to consist of caesium cations (Cs+) and auride anions (Au−) although it was some years before this conclusion was accepted. Several other aurides (KAu, RbAu) have since been synthesized, as well as the red transparent compound Cs2Pt which was found to contain Cs+ and Pt2− ions.

Manganese
Well-behaved metals have crystal structures featuring unit cells with up to four atoms. Manganese has a complex crystal structure with a 58-atom unit cell, effectively four different atomic radii, and four different coordination numbers (10, 11, 12 and 16). It has been described as resembling "a quaternary intermetallic compound with four Mn atom types bonding as if they were different elements." The half-filled 3d shell of manganese appears to be the cause of the complexity. This confers a large magnetic moment on each atom. Below 727 °C, a unit cell of 58 spatially diverse atoms represents the energetically lowest way of achieving a zero net magnetic moment. The crystal structure of manganese makes it a hard and brittle metal, with low electrical and thermal conductivity. At higher temperatures "greater lattice vibrations nullify magnetic effects" and manganese adopts less complex structures.

Iron, cobalt, nickel, gadolinium, terbium, dysprosium, holmium, erbium, thulium
The only elements strongly attracted to magnets are iron, cobalt, and nickel at room temperature, gadolinium just below, and terbium, dysprosium, holmium, erbium, and thulium at ultra cold temperatures (below −54 °C, −185 °C, −254 °C, −254 °C, and −241 °C respectively).

Iridium
The only element encountered with an oxidation state of +9 is iridium, in the [IrO4]+ cation. Other than this, the highest known oxidation state is +8, in Ru, Xe, Os, Ir, and Hs.

Gold
The malleability of gold is extraordinary: a fist sized lump can be hammered and separated into one million paper back sized sheets, each 10 nm thick, 1600 times thinner than regular kitchen aluminium foil (0.016 mm thick). 

Mercury
Bricks and bowling balls will float on the surface of mercury thanks to it having a density 13.5 times that of water. Equally, a solid mercury bowling ball would weigh around 50 pounds and, if it could be kept cold enough, would float on the surface of liquid gold.
The only metal having an ionisation energy higher than some nonmetals (sulfur and selenium) is mercury.
Mercury and its compounds have a reputation for toxicity but on a scale of 1 to 10, dimethylmercury ((CH3)2Hg) (abbr. DMM), a volatile colourless liquid, has been described as a 15. It is so dangerous that scientists have been encouraged to use less toxic mercury compounds wherever possible. In 1997, Karen Wetterhahn, a professor of chemistry specialising in toxic metal exposure, died of mercury poisoning ten months after a few drops of DMM landed on her "protective" latex gloves. Although Wetterhahn had been following the then published procedures for handling this compound, it passed through her gloves and skin within seconds. It is now known that DMM is exceptionally permeable to (ordinary) gloves, skin and tissues. And its toxicity is such that less than one-tenth of a ml applied to the skin will be seriously toxic.

Lead
The expression, to "go down like a lead balloon" is anchored in the common view of lead as a dense, heavy metal—being nearly as dense as mercury. However, it is possible to construct a balloon made of lead foil, filled with a helium and air mixture, which will float and be buoyant enough to carry a small load.

Bismuth
Bismuth has the longest half-life of any naturally occurring element; its only primordial isotope, bismuth-209, was found in 2003 to be slightly radioactive, decaying via alpha decay with a half-life more than a billion times the estimated age of the universe. Prior to this discovery, bismuth-209 was thought to be the heaviest naturally occurring stable isotope; this distinction now belongs to lead-208.

Uranium
The only element with a naturally occurring isotope capable of undergoing nuclear fission is uranium. The capacity of uranium-235 to undergo fission was first suggested (and ignored) in 1934, and subsequently discovered in 1938.

Plutonium
It is a commonly held belief that metals reduce their electrical conductivity when heated. Plutonium increases its electrical conductivity when heated in the temperature range of around –175 to +125 °C.

Metalloids

Boron
Boron is the only element with a partially disordered structure in its most thermodynamically stable crystalline form.

Boron, antimony
These elements are record holders within the field of superacid chemistry. For seven decades, fluorosulfonic acid HSO3F and trifluoromethanesulfonic acid CF3SO3H were the strongest known acids that could be isolated as single compounds. Both are about a thousand times more acidic than pure sulfuric acid. In 2004, a boron compound broke this record by a thousand fold with the synthesis of carborane acid H(CHB11Cl11). Another metalloid, antimony, features in the strongest known acid, a mixture 10 billion times stronger than carborane acid. This is fluoroantimonic acid H2F[SbF6], a mixture of antimony pentafluoride SbF5 and hydrofluoric acid HF.

Silicon
The thermal conductivity of silicon is better than that of most metals.
A sponge-like porous form of silicon (p-Si) is typically prepared by the electrochemical etching of silicon wafers in a hydrofluoric acid solution. Flakes of p-Si sometimes appear red; it has a band gap of 1.97–2.1 eV. The many tiny pores in porous silicon give it an enormous internal surface area, up to 1,000 m2/cm3. When exposed to an oxidant, especially a liquid oxidant, the high surface-area to volume ratio of p-Si creates a very efficient burn, accompanied by nano-explosions, and sometimes by ball-lightning-like plasmoids with, for example, a diameter of 0.1–0.8 m, a velocity of up to 0.5 m/s and a lifetime of up to 1s. The first ever spectrographic analysis of a ball lightning event (in 2012) revealed the presence of silicon, iron and calcium, these elements also being present in the soil.

Arsenic
Metals are said to be fusible, resulting in some confusion in old chemistry as to whether arsenic was a true metal, or a nonmetal, or something in between. It sublimes rather than melts at standard atmospheric pressure, like the nonmetals carbon and red phosphorus.

Antimony
A high-energy explosive form of antimony was first obtained in 1858. It is prepared by the electrolysis of any of the heavier antimony trihalides (SbCl3, SbBr3, SbI3) in a hydrochloric acid solution at low temperature. It comprises amorphous antimony with some occluded antimony trihalide (7–20% in the case of the trichloride). When scratched, struck, powdered or heated quickly to 200 °C, it "flares up, emits sparks and is converted explosively into the lower-energy, crystalline grey antimony."

Nonmetals

Hydrogen
Water (H2O), a well known oxide of hydrogen, is a spectacular anomaly. Extrapolating from the heavier hydrogen chalcogenides, namely hydrogen sulfide H2S, hydrogen selenide H2Se, and hydrogen telluride H2Te, water should be "a foul-smelling, poisonous, inflammable gas…condensing to a nasty liquid [at] around –100° C". Instead, due to hydrogen bonding, water is "stable, potable, odorless, benign, and…indispensable to life".
Less well known of the oxides of hydrogen is the trioxide, H2O3. Berthelot proposed the existence of this oxide in 1880 but his suggestion was soon forgotten as there was no way of testing it using the technology of the time. Hydrogen trioxide was prepared in 1994 by replacing the oxygen used in the industrial process for making hydrogen peroxide, with ozone. The yield is about 40 per cent, at –78 °C; above around –40 °C it decomposes into water and oxygen. Mendeleev went a step further, in 1895, and proposed the existence of hydrogen tetroxide  as a transient intermediate in the decomposition of hydrogen peroxide; this was prepared and characterised in 1974, using a matrix isolation technique. Alkali metal ozonide salts of the unknown hydrogen ozonide (HO3) are also known; these have the formula MO3.

Helium
At temperatures below 0.3 and 0.8 K respectively, helium-3 and helium-4 each have a negative enthalpy of fusion. This means that, at the appropriate constant pressures, these substances freeze with the addition of heat.
Until 1999 helium was thought to be too small to form a cage clathrate—a compound in which a guest atom or molecule is encapsulated in a cage formed by a host molecule—at atmospheric pressure. In that year the synthesis of microgram quantities of He@C20H20 represented the first such helium clathrate and (what was described as) the world's smallest helium balloon.

Carbon
Graphite is the most electrically conductive nonmetal, better than some metals.
Diamond is the best natural conductor of heat; it even feels cold to the touch. Its thermal conductivity (2,200 W/m•K) is five times greater than the most conductive metal (Ag at 429); 300 times higher than the least conductive metal (Pu at 6.74); and nearly 4,000 times that of water (0.58) and 100,000 times that of air (0.0224). This high thermal conductivity is used by jewelers and gemologists to separate diamonds from imitations.
Graphene aerogel, produced in 2012 by freeze-drying a solution of carbon nanotubes and graphite oxide sheets and chemically removing oxygen, is seven times lighter than air, and ten per cent lighter than helium. It is the lightest solid known (0.16 mg/cm3), conductive and elastic.

Phosphorus
The least stable and most reactive form of phosphorus is the white allotrope. It is a hazardous, highly flammable and toxic substance, spontaneously igniting in air and producing phosphoric acid residue. It is therefore normally stored under water. White phosphorus is also the most common, industrially important, and easily reproducible allotrope, and for these reasons is regarded as the standard state of phosphorus. The most stable form is the black allotrope, which is a metallic looking, brittle and relatively non-reactive semiconductor (unlike the white allotrope, which has a white or yellowish appearance, is pliable, highly reactive and a semiconductor). When assessing periodicity in the physical properties of the elements it needs to be borne in mind that the quoted properties of phosphorus tend to be those of its least stable form rather than, as is the case with all other elements, the most stable form.

Iodine
The mildest of the halogens, iodine is the active ingredient in tincture of iodine, a disinfectant. This can be found in household medicine cabinets or emergency survival kits. Tincture of iodine will rapidly dissolve gold, a task ordinarily requiring the use of aqua regia (a highly corrosive mixture of nitric and hydrochloric acids).

Notes

Citations

References

Addison WE 1964, The allotropy of the elements, Oldbourne Press, London
Adler D 1969, 'Half-way elements: The technology of metalloids', book review, Technology Review, vol. 72, no. 1, Oct/Nov, pp. 18–19
Anita M 1998, 'Focus: Levitating Liquid Boron', American Physical Society, viewed 14 December 2014
Anthony S 2013, 'Graphene aerogel is seven times lighter than air, can balance on a blade of grass', ExtremeTech, April 10, accessed 8 February 2015

Askeland DR, Fulay PP & Wright JW 2011, The science and engineering of materials, 6th ed., Cengage Learning, Stamford, CT, 
Atkins P, Overton T, Rourke J, Weller M & Armstrong F 2006, Shriver & Atkins' inorganic chemistry, 4th ed., Oxford University Press, Oxford, 
Austen K 2012, 'A factory for elements that barely exist', NewScientist, 21 Apr, p. 12, ISSN 1032-1233
Bagnall KW 1966, The chemistry of selenium, tellurium and polonium, Elsevier, Amsterdam
Bailar JC, Moeller T, Kleinberg J, Guss CO, Castellion ME & Metz C 1989, Chemistry, 3rd ed., Harcourt Brace Jovanovich, San Diego, 
Bassett LG, Bunce SC, Carter AE, Clark HM & Hollinger HB 1966, Principles of chemistry, Prentice-Hall, Englewood Cliffs, NJ
Batsanov SS & Batsanov AS 2012, Introduction to structural chemistry, Springer Science+Business Media, Dordrecht, 
Benedict M, Alvarez LW, Bliss LA, English SG, Kinzell AB, Morrison P, English FH, Starr C & Williams WJ 1946, 'Technological control of atomic energy activities', "Bulletin of the Atomic Scientists," vol. 2, no. 11, pp. 18–29

Berei K & Vasáros L 1985, 'Astatine compounds', in Kugler & Keller

Beveridge TJ, Hughes MN, Lee H, Leung KT, Poole RK, Savvaidis I, Silver S & Trevors JT 1997, 'Metal–microbe interactions: Contemporary approaches', in RK Poole (ed.), Advances in microbial physiology, vol. 38, Academic Press, San Diego, pp. 177–243, 
Bogoroditskii NP & Pasynkov VV 1967, Radio and electronic materials, Iliffe Books, London
Booth VH & Bloom ML 1972, Physical science: a study of matter and energy, Macmillan, New York
Born M & Wolf E 1999, Principles of optics: Electromagnetic theory of propagation, interference and diffraction of light, 7th ed., Cambridge University Press, Cambridge, 

Brasted RC 1974, 'Oxygen group elements and their compounds', in The new Encyclopædia Britannica, vol. 13, Encyclopædia Britannica, Chicago, pp. 809–824
Brescia F, Arents J, Meislich H & Turk A 1975, Fundamentals of chemistry, 3rd ed., Academic Press, New York, p. 453, 
Brinkley SR 1945, Introductory general chemistry, 3rd ed., Macmillan, New York
Brown TL, LeMay HE, Bursten BE, Murphy CJ & Woodward P 2009, Chemistry: The Central Science, 11th ed., Pearson Education, New Jersey, 
Burakowski T & Wierzchoń T 1999, Surface engineering of metals: Principles, equipment, technologies, CRC Press, Boca Raton, Fla, 
Bychkov VL 2012, 'Unsolved Mystery of Ball Lightning', in Atomic Processes in Basic and Applied Physics, V Shevelko & H Tawara (eds), Springer Science & Business Media, Heidelberg, pp. 3–24, 
Carapella SC 1968a, 'Arsenic' in CA Hampel (ed.), The encyclopedia of the chemical elements, Reinhold, New York, pp. 29–32

Chang R 1994, Chemistry, 5th (international) ed., McGraw-Hill, New York
Chang R 2002, Chemistry, 7th ed., McGraw Hill, Boston
Chedd G 1969, Half-way elements: The technology of metalloids, Doubleday, New York

Chizhikov DM & Shchastlivyi VP 1968, Selenium and selenides, translated from the Russian by EM Elkin, Collet's, London
Choppin GR & Johnsen RH 1972, Introductory chemistry, Addison-Wesley, Reading, Massachusetts
Christensen RM 2012, 'Are the elements ductile or brittle: A nanoscale evaluation,' in Failure theory for materials science and engineering, chapter 12, p. 14

Cordes EH & Scaheffer R 1973, Chemistry, Harper & Row, New York
Cotton SA 1994, 'Scandium, yttrium & the lanthanides: Inorganic & coordination chemistry', in RB King (ed.), Encyclopedia of inorganic chemistry, 2nd ed., vol. 7, John Wiley & Sons, New York, pp. 3595–3616, 
Cox PA 2004, Inorganic chemistry, 2nd ed., Instant notes series, Bios Scientific, London, 

Cverna F 2002, ASM ready reference: Thermal properties of metals, ASM International, Materials Park, Ohio, 
Dalhouse University 2015, 'Dal chemist discovers new information about elemental boron', media release, 28 January, accessed 9 May 2015
Deming HG 1952, General chemistry: An elementary survey, 6th ed., John Wiley & Sons, New York

Donohoe J 1982, The Structures of the Elements, Robert E. Krieger, Malabar, Florida, 

Dunstan S 1968, Principles of chemistry, D. Van Nostrand Company, London
Du Plessis M 2007, 'A Gravimetric Technique to Determine the Crystallite Size Distribution in High Porosity Nanoporous Silicon, in JA Martino, MA Pavanello & C Claeys (eds), Microelectronics Technology and Devices–SBMICRO 2007, vol. 9, no. 1, The Electrochemical Society, New Jersey, pp. 133–142, 
Eby GS, Waugh CL, Welch HE & Buckingham BH 1943, The physical sciences, Ginn and Company, Boston

Edwards PP 1999, 'Chemically engineering the metallic, insulating and superconducting state of matter' in KR Seddon & M Zaworotko (eds), Crystal engineering: The design and application of functional solids, Kluwer Academic, Dordrecht, pp. 409–431
Edwards PP 2000, 'What, why and when is a metal?', in N Hall (ed.), The new chemistry, Cambridge University, Cambridge, pp. 85–114
Edwards PP, Lodge MTJ, Hensel F & Redmer R 2010, '...a metal conducts and a non-metal doesn't', Philosophical Transactions of the Royal Society A: Mathematical, Physical and Engineering Sciences, vol. 368, pp. 941–965, 
Eichler R, Aksenov NV, Belozerov AV, Bozhikov GA, Chepigin VI, Dmitriev SN, Dressler R, Gäggeler HW, Gorshkov VA, Haenssler F, Itkis MG, Laube A, Lebedev VY, Malyshev ON, Oganessian YT, Petrushkin OV, Piguet D, Rasmussen P,  Shishkin SV, Shutov, AV, Svirikhin AI, Tereshatov EE, Vostokin GK, Wegrzecki M & Yeremin AV 2007, 'Chemical characterization of element 112,' Nature, vol. 447, pp. 72–75, 
Endicott K 1998, 'The Trembling Edge of Science', Dartmouth Alumini Magazine, April, accessed 8 May 2015
Emsley 1994, 'Science: Surprise legacy of Germany's Flying Bombs', New Scientist, no. 1910, January 29
Emsley J 2001, Nature's building blocks: An A–Z guide to the elements, 
Fraden JH 1951, 'Amorphous antimony. A lecture demonstration in allotropy', Journal of Chemical Education, vol. 28, no. 1, pp. 34–35, 
Furuseth S, Selte K, Hope H, Kjekshus A & Klewe B 1974, 'Iodine oxides. Part V. The crystal structure of (IO)2SO4', Acta Chemica Scandinavica A, vol. 28, pp. 71–76, 
Georgievskii VI 1982, 'Biochemical regions. Mineral composition of feeds', in VI Georgievskii, BN Annenkov & VT Samokhin (eds), Mineral nutrition of animals: Studies in the agricultural and food sciences, Butterworths, London, pp. 57–68, 
Gillespie RJ & Robinson EA 1959, 'The sulphuric acid solvent system', in HJ Emeléus & AG Sharpe (eds), Advances in inorganic chemistry and radiochemistry, vol. 1, Academic Press, New York, pp. 386–424
Glazov VM, Chizhevskaya SN & Glagoleva NN 1969, Liquid semiconductors, Plenum, New York
Glinka N 1965, General chemistry, trans. D Sobolev, Gordon & Breach, New York
Gösele U & Lehmann V 1994, 'Porous Silicon Quantum Sponge Structures: Formation Mechanism, Preparation Methods and Some Properties', in Feng ZC & Tsu R (eds), Porous Silicon, World Scientific, Singapore, pp. 17–40, 
Greaves GN, Greer AL, Lakes RS & Rouxel T 2011, 'Poisson's ratio and modern materials', Nature Materials, vol. 10, pp. 823‒837, 
Greenwood NN & Earnshaw A 2002, Chemistry of the elements, 2nd ed., Butterworth-Heinemann, 
Gschneidner KA 1964, 'Physical properties and interrelationships of metallic and semimetallic elements,' Solid State Physics, vol. 16, pp. 275‒426, 
Gupta A, Awana VPS, Samanta SB, Kishan H & Narlikar AV 2005, 'Disordered superconductors' in AV Narlikar (ed.), Frontiers in superconducting materials, Springer-Verlag, Berlin, p. 502, 
Habashi F 2003, Metals from ores: an introduction to extractive metallurgy, Métallurgie Extractive Québec, Sainte Foy, Québec, 
Manson SS & Halford GR 2006, Fatigue and Durability of Structural Materials, ASM International, Materials Park, OH, 
Hem JD 1985, Study and interpretation of the chemical characteristics of natural water, paper 2254, 3rd ed., US Geological Society, Alexandria, Virginia
Hampel CA & Hawley GG 1976, Glossary of chemical terms, Van Nostrand Reinhold, New York
Hérold A 2006, 'An arrangement of the chemical elements in several classes inside the periodic table according to their common properties', Comptes Rendus Chimie, vol. 9, pp. 148–153, 
Herzfeld K 1927, 'On atomic properties which make an element a metal', Phys. Rev., vol. 29, no. 5, pp. 701–705, 
Heslop RB & Robinson PL 1963, Inorganic chemistry: A guide to advanced study, Elsevier, Amsterdam
Hill G & Holman J 2000, Chemistry in context, 5th ed., Nelson Thornes, Cheltenham, 
Hiller LA & Herber RH 1960, Principles of chemistry, McGraw-Hill, New York
Holtzclaw HF, Robinson WR & Odom JD 1991, General chemistry, 9th ed., DC Heath, Lexington, 
Hopcroft MA, Nix WD & Kenny TW 2010, 'What is the Young's modulus of silicon?', Journal of Microelectromechanical Systems, vol. 19, no. 2, pp. 229‒238, 
Chemistry Views 2012, 'Horst Prinzbach (1931 – 2012)', Wiley-VCH, accessed 28 February 2015
 Huheey JE, Keiter EA & Keiter RL 1993, Principles of Structure & Reactivity, 4th ed., HarperCollins College Publishers, 
Hultgren HH 1966, 'Metalloids', in GL Clark & GG Hawley (eds), The encyclopedia of inorganic chemistry, 2nd ed., Reinhold Publishing, New York
Hunt A 2000, The complete A-Z chemistry handbook, 2nd ed., Hodder & Stoughton, London
Iler RK 1979, The chemistry of silica: solubility, polymerization, colloid and surface properties, and biochemistry, John Wiley, New York, 

Jauncey GEM 1948, Modern physics: A second course in college physics, D. Von Nostrand, New York
Jenkins GM & Kawamura K 1976, Polymeric carbons—carbon fibre, glass and char, Cambridge University Press, Cambridge
Keenan CW, Kleinfelter DC & Wood JH 1980, General college chemistry, 6th ed., Harper & Row, San Francisco, 
Keogh DW 2005, 'Actinides: Inorganic & coordination chemistry', in RB King (ed.), Encyclopedia of inorganic chemistry, 2nd ed., vol. 1, John Wiley & Sons, New York, pp. 2–32, 
Klein CA & Cardinale GF 1992, 'Young's modulus and Poisson's ratio of CVD diamond', in A Feldman & S Holly, SPIE Proceedings, vol. 1759, Diamond Optics V, pp. 178‒192, 
Kneen WR, Rogers MJW & Simpson P 1972, Chemistry: Facts, patterns, and principles, Addison-Wesley, London
Kovalev D, Timoshenko VY, Künzner N, Gross E & Koch F 2001, 'Strong Explosive Interaction of Hydrogenated Porous Silicon with Oxygen at Cryogenic Temperatures', Physical Review Letters, vol. 87, pp. 068301–1–06831-4, 
Kozyrev PT 1959, 'Deoxidized selenium and the dependence of its electrical conductivity on pressure. II', Physics of the solid state, translation of the journal Solid State Physics (Fizika tverdogo tela) of the Academy of Sciences of the USSR, vol. 1, pp. 102–110
Kugler HK & Keller C (eds) 1985, Gmelin Handbook of Inorganic and Organometallic chemistry, 8th ed., 'At, Astatine', system no. 8a, Springer-Verlag, Berlin, 
Lagrenaudie J 1953, 'Semiconductive properties of boron' (in French), Journal de chimie physique, vol. 50, nos. 11–12, Nov-Dec, pp. 629–633
Lazaruk SK, Dolbik AV, Labunov VA & Borisenko VE 2007, 'Combustion and Explosion of Nanostructured Silicon in Microsystem Devices', Semiconductors, vol. 41, no. 9, pp. 1113–1116, 
Legit D, Friák M & Šob M 2010, 'Phase Stability, Elasticity, and Theoretical Strength of Polonium from First Principles,' Physical Review B, vol. 81, pp. 214118–1–19, 
Leith MM 1966, Velocity of sound in solid iodine, MSc thesis, University of British Columbia. Leith comments that, '... as iodine is anisotropic in many of its physical properties most attention was paid to two amorphous samples which were thought to give representative average values of the properties of iodine' (p. iii).
Lide DR & Frederikse HPR (eds) 1998, CRC Handbook of chemistry and physics, 79th ed., CRC Press, Boca Raton, Florida, 
Lidin RA 1996, Inorganic substances handbook, Begell House, New York, 
Lindegaard AL and Dahle B 1966, 'Fracture phenomena in amorphous selenium', Journal of Applied Physics, vol. 37, no. 1, pp. 262‒66, 
Mann JB, Meek TL & Allen LC 2000, 'Configuration energies of the main group elements', Journal of the American Chemical Society, vol. 122, no. 12, pp. 2780–2783, 
Marlowe MO 1970, Elastic properties of three grades of fine grained graphite to 2000°C, NASA CR‒66933, National Aeronautics and Space Administration, Scientific and Technical Information Facility, College Park, Maryland
Martienssen W & Warlimont H (eds) 2005, Springer Handbook of Condensed Matter and Materials Data, Springer, Heidelberg, 
Matula RA 1979, 'Electrical resistivity of copper, gold, palladium, and silver,' Journal of Physical and Chemical Reference Data, vol. 8, no. 4, pp. 1147–1298, 
McQuarrie DA & Rock PA 1987, General chemistry, 3rd ed., WH Freeman, New York
Mendeléeff DI 1897, The Principles of Chemistry, vol. 2, 5th ed., trans. G Kamensky, AJ Greenaway (ed.), Longmans, Green & Co., London
Mercier R & Douglade J 1982, 'Structure cristalline d'un oxysulfate d'arsenic(III) As2O(SO4)2 (ou As2O3.2SO3)', Acta Crystallographica Section B:, vol. 38, no. 3, pp. 1731–1735, 
Metcalfe HC, Williams JE & Castka JF 1966, Modern chemistry, 3rd ed., Holt, Rinehart and Winston, New York
Mikulec FV, Kirtland JD & Sailor MJ 2002, 'Explosive Nanocrystalline Porous Silicon and Its Use in Atomic Emission Spectroscopy', Advanced Materials, vol. 14, no. 1, pp. 38–41, 
Moss TS 1952, Photoconductivity in the Elements, London, Butterworths
Mott NF & Davis EA 2012, 'Electronic Processes in Non-Crystalline Materials', 2nd ed., Oxford University Press, Oxford, 
Nakao Y 1992, 'Dissolution of Noble Metals in Halogen-Halide-Polar Organic Solvent Systems', Journal of the Chemical Society, Chemical Communications, no. 5, pp. 426–427, 
Nemodruk AA & Karalova ZK 1969, Analytical chemistry of boron, R Kondor trans., Ann Arbor Humphrey Science, Ann Arbor, Michigan
New Scientist 1975, 'Chemistry on the islands of stability', 11 Sep, p. 574, ISSN 1032-1233
Noddack I 1934, 'On element 93', Angewandte Chemie, vol. 47, no. 37, pp. 653–655, 
Olechna DJ & Knox RS 1965, 'Energy-band structure of selenium chains', Physical Review, vol. 140, pp. A986‒A993, 
Orton JW 2004, The story of semiconductors, Oxford University, Oxford, 
Parish RV 1977, The metallic elements, Longman, London
Partington JR 1944, A text-book of inorganic chemistry, 5th ed., Macmillan & Co., London
Pauling L 1988, General chemistry, Dover Publications, NY, 
Perkins D 1998, Mineralogy, Prentice Hall Books, Upper Saddle River, New Jersey, 
Pottenger FM & Bowes EE 1976, Fundamentals of chemistry, Scott, Foresman and Co., Glenview, Illinois
Qin J, Nishiyama N, Ohfuji H, Shinmei T, Lei L, Heb D & Irifune T 2012, 'Polycrystalline γ-boron: As hard as polycrystalline cubic boron nitride', Scripta Materialia, vol. 67, pp. 257‒260, 
Rao CNR & Ganguly P 1986, 'A new criterion for the metallicity of elements', Solid State Communications, vol. 57, no. 1, pp. 5–6, 
Rao KY 2002, Structural chemistry of glasses, Elsevier, Oxford, 
Raub CJ & Griffith WP 1980, 'Osmium and sulphur', in Gmelin handbook of inorganic chemistry, 8th ed., 'Os, Osmium: Supplement,' K Swars (ed.), system no. 66, Springer-Verlag, Berlin, pp. 166–170, 
Ravindran P, Fast L, Korzhavyi PA, Johansson B, Wills J & Eriksson O 1998, 'Density functional theory for calculation of elastic properties of orthorhombic crystals: Application to TiSi2', Journal of Applied Physics, vol. 84, no. 9, pp. 4891‒4904, 
Reynolds WN 1969, Physical properties of graphite, Elsevier, Amsterdam
Rochow EG 1966, The metalloids, DC Heath and Company, Boston
Rock PA & Gerhold GA 1974, Chemistry: Principles and applications, WB Saunders, Philadelphia
Russell JB 1981, General chemistry, McGraw-Hill, Auckland
Russell AM & Lee KL 2005, Structure-property relations in nonferrous metals, Wiley-Interscience, New York, 
Sacks O 2001, Uncle Tungsten: Memories of a chemical boyhood, Alfred A Knopf, New York, 
Sanderson RT 1960, Chemical periodicity, Reinhold Publishing, New York
Sanderson RT 1967, Inorganic chemistry, Reinhold, New York
Sanderson K 2012, 'Stinky rocks hide Earth's only haven for natural fluorine', Nature News, July, 
Schaefer JC 1968, 'Boron' in CA Hampel (ed.), The encyclopedia of the chemical elements, Reinhold, New York, pp. 73–81
Sidgwick NV 1950, The chemical elements and their compounds, vol. 1, Clarendon, Oxford
Sidorov TA 1960, 'The connection between structural oxides and their tendency to glass formation', Glass and Ceramics, vol. 17, no. 11, pp. 599–603, 
Sisler HH 1973, Electronic structure, properties, and the periodic law, Van Nostrand, New York
Slezak 2014, 'Natural ball lightning probed for the first time', New Scientist, 16 January
Slough W 1972, 'Discussion of session 2b: Crystal structure and bond mechanism of metallic compounds', in O Kubaschewski (ed.), Metallurgical chemistry, proceedings of a symposium held at Brunel University and the National Physical Laboratory on the 14, 15 and 16 July 1971, Her Majesty's Stationery Office [for the] National Physical Laboratory, London
Slyh JA 1955, 'Graphite', in JF Hogerton & RC Grass (eds), Reactor handbook: Materials, US Atomic Energy Commission, McGraw Hill, New York, pp. 133‒154
Smith A 1921, General chemistry for colleges, 2nd ed., Century, New York
Sneed MC 1954, General college chemistry, Van Nostrand, New York
Sommer AH, 'Alloys of Gold with alkali metals', Nature, vol. 152, p. 215, 
Soverna S 2004, 'Indication for a gaseous element 112,' in U Grundinger (ed.), GSI Scientific Report 2003, GSI Report 2004-1, p. 187, ISSN 0174-0814
Stoker HS 2010, General, organic, and biological chemistry, 5th ed., Brooks/Cole, Cengage Learning, Belmont CA, 
Stoye E 2014, 'Iridium forms compound in +9 oxidation state', Chemistry World, 23 October
Sun H, Xu Z & Gao C 2013, 'Multifunctional, Ultra-Flyweight, Synergistically Assembled Carbon Aerogels', Advanced Materials,, vol. 25, no. 18, pp. 2554–2560, 
Sundara Rao RVG 1950, 'Elastic constants of orthorhombic sulphur,' Proceedings of the Indian Academy of Sciences, Section A, vol. 32, no. 4, pp. 275–278, 
Sundara Rao RVG 1954, 'Erratum to: Elastic constants of orthorhombic sulphur', Proceedings of the Indian Academy of Sciences, Section A, vol. 40, no. 3, p. 151
Swalin RA 1962, Thermodynamics of solids, John Wiley & Sons, New York
Tilley RJD 2004, Understanding solids: The science of materials, 4th ed., John Wiley, New York
Walker JD, Newman MC & Enache M 2013, Fundamental QSARs for metal ions, CRC Press, Boca Raton, 
White MA, Cerqueira AB, Whitman CA, Johnson MB & Ogitsu T 2015, 'Determination of Phase Stability of Elemental Boron', Angewandte Chemie International Edition, 
Wiberg N 2001, Inorganic chemistry, Academic Press, San Diego, 
Wickleder MS, Pley M & Büchner O 2006, 'Sulfates of precious metals: Fascinating chemistry of potential materials', Zeitschrift für anorganische und allgemeine chemie, vol. 632, nos. 12–13, p. 2080, 
Wickleder MS 2007, 'Chalcogen-oxygen chemistry', in FA Devillanova (ed.), Handbook of chalcogen chemistry: new perspectives in sulfur, selenium and tellurium, RSC, Cambridge, pp. 344–377, 
Wilson JR 1965, 'The structure of liquid metals and alloys', Metallurgical reviews, vol. 10, p. 502
Wilson AH 1966, Thermodynamics and statistical mechanics, Cambridge University, Cambridge
Witczak Z, Goncharova VA & Witczak PP 2000, 'Irreversible effect of hydrostatic pressure on the elastic properties of polycrystalline tellurium', in MH Manghnani, WJ Nellis & MF Nicol (eds), Science and technology of high pressure: Proceedings of the International Conference on High Pressure Science and Technology (AIRAPT-17), Honolulu, Hawaii, 25‒30 July 1999, vol. 2, Universities Press, Hyderabad, pp. 822‒825, 
Witt SF 1991, 'Dimethylmercury', Occupational Safety & Health Administration Hazard Information Bulletin, US Department of Labor, February 15, accessed 8 May 2015
Wittenberg LJ 1972, 'Volume contraction during melting; emphasis on lanthanide and actinide metals', The Journal of Chemical Physics, vol. 56, no. 9, p. 4526, 
Wulfsberg G 2000, Inorganic chemistry, University Science Books, Sausalito CA, 
Young RV & Sessine S (eds) 2000, World of chemistry, Gale Group, Farmington Hills, Michigan
Zhigal'skii GP & Jones BK 2003, Physical properties of thin metal films, Taylor & Francis, London, 
Zuckerman & Hagen (eds) 1991, Inorganic reactions and methods, vol, 5: The formation of bonds to group VIB (O, S, Se, Te, Po) elements (part 1), VCH Publishers, Deerfield Beach, Fla, 

Metals
Metalloids
Nonmetals